The 2021 Greater Visakhapatnam Municipal Corporation election were held on 10 March 2021 to elect members to all 98 wards of the municipal corporation. The ruling YSRCP party was able to cross the magic figure and won the GVMC Elections 2021. Of 98 wards, YSRCP won 58 wards, TDP won 30 wards, Janasena Party won 4 wards, BJP won 1 ward , CPI, CPM 1 each and 3 wards are won by Independents.

Election schedule

Corporation election 2021

Results by ward

References

External links
Greater Visakhapatnam Municipal Corporatio 

2021 local elections in Andhra Pradesh
Visakhapatnam
Government of Visakhapatnam